Matteo Pietro Olivero (15 June 1879 - 28 April 1932) was an Italian painter, known for his technique of reproducing sunlight reflections without physically mixing colour pigments. For that matter he is considered a leading painter of the Italian divisionism, although he's still little-known outside the art collector's environment. In 1896 Matteo Olivero attended the Accademia Albertina delle Belle Arti in Turin. During his life, he took part in several exhibitions across Europe and started a collaboration with "Les Tendances Nouvelles", a Parisian art journal.

After a visit to a St. Moritz exhibition he became a close friend of the painter Giuseppe Pellizza da Volpedo , with whom he started a written correspondence and, afterwards, a collaboration.

Fatherless since early childhood, he was very close to his mother Lucia Rosano. He considered her an inspiration for his paintings. His mother died on 27th March 1930 aged 86. The loss drove Olivero into a deep depression. Luigi Burgo, a local businessman and owner of a paper mill, took Olivero under his custody, hosting him in his house and becoming his patron.

A relevant collection of his works is on display at the "Pinacoteca Matteo Olivero" in Saluzzo.

Death 
On 28 April 1932, Olivero committed suicide by throwing himself out of a window.

Gallery

References

External links

 saluzzoturistica.it - Pinacoteca Matteo Olivero

1879 births
1932 deaths
Italian painters
Divisionist painters
People from the Province of Cuneo
1932 suicides
Suicides by jumping in Italy